Raz Reid and Allan Stone won the title, defeating Mike Estep and Paul Kronk 7–6, 6–4 in the final.

Draw

Draw

References
 Draw (ITF Tennis)

Doubles